is a French supernatural television series. The plot revolves around three teenagers, two of whom have acquired superpowers after making a deal with a supernatural being in order to solve a murder. The show premiered on Netflix on 21 November 2019. The second season premiered on 2 July 2021.

Synopsis
Two teenagers, Sofiane and Victor, make a pact with a voodoo god Obé to allow them solve and avenge the apparent murder of Sofiane's brother, Reda. Sofiane is given the power by Obé to manipulate other people's actions, while Victor can read their minds. Both however must be present near each other for their powers to work. They then enlist the help of Luisa, who practices voodoo with her grandmother, so they may be free of the grip that Obé has on them and banish Obé from the world.

Cast and characters
 Carl Malapa as Sofiane Kada
 Némo Schiffman as Victor Wanderwelt
 Manon Bresch as Luisa Manjimbe
 Corentin Fila as Obé
 Sami Outalbali as Reda Kada, brother of Sofiane
 Firmine Richard as Elizabeth, Luisa's grandmother
 Anaïs Thomas as Audrey Jourdant
 Raphaëlle Agogué as Celine Wanderwelt
 Marvin Dubart as Bastien Duponchel
 Léa Léviant as Melanie
 Assa Sylla as Nora Cissoko
 Stéphane Brel as Herve
Daouda Keita as Ousmane Blanchard

Episodes

Season 1 (2019)

Season 2 (2021)

Reception
The show received a mixed reception from the critics.
GQ magazine, despite some reservation about its special effect, praised the skill of the story-telling, the acting of the principal actors, as well as the soundtracks. It considered the show to be the best French series since the launch of Netflix and deserving of a second season. Télérama was highly critical, considering the series more laughable than a hit, and its music failed to hide its stylistic flaws. Premiere thought the series veered awkwardly between teen drama and its supernatural elements but was nevertheless successful stylistically. Based only on its first episode, the Decider found the series to be too muddled to continue watching a second episode.

References

External links
 
 

2010s French drama television series
Television shows set in France
French-language Netflix original programming
2010s teen drama television series
French supernatural television series
French fantasy television series
2019 French television series debuts
Television series about teenagers